WQJJ-LP (101.9 FM, "101.9 Fox-FM") is an American low-power FM radio station licensed to serve the community of Jasper, Alabama. WQJJ-LP is owned by North Alabama Public Service Broadcasters.

WQJJ-LP was silent for a time after October 17, 2018. In its application for special temporary authority from the FCC, the station cited the loss of its studio and transmitter sites.

WQJJ-LP resumed broadcasting and is available again on both FM broadcast at 101.9 MHz. as well as online at Cat40Hits.com - 101.9 Fox FM Online

History
For more than five days following the April 27, 2011 tornado outbreak which wiped out several local areas, WQJJ-LP was the only broadcast facility in Walker County to be on the air. WQJJ-LP management sought and obtained special temporary authority from the FCC to increase power for the duration of the emergency situation.

On December 25, 2012, the station changed frequencies from its original 97.7 MHz to 100.1 MHz. Due to severe interference received from a new Birmingham FM translator, also authorized to operate on 100.1 MHz., the station relocated again effective February 29, 2016 to 101.9 MHz for a greatly improved and interference free signal.

References

External links
Cat40Hits.com - 101.9 Fox FM Online

QJJ-LP
QJJ-LP
Mainstream adult contemporary radio stations in the United States
Oldies radio stations in the United States
Radio stations established in 2005
Walker County, Alabama
2005 establishments in Alabama